Stanisław Brzeski (21 April 1918 – 3 December 1972)  was a Polish fighter ace of the Polish Air Force in World War II with 8 confirmed kills and one shared.

Biography
Stanisław Brzeski was born in Lipnik near Staszów in 1918. In 1932 he entered the Non-Commissioned Officer's School for minors in Nisko. Then he served in the 77th Infantry Regiment. In 1936 he was transferred to the Polish Air Force. Initially he became a glider pilot, then he was trained as a fighter pilot.

At the outbreak of World War II, Brzeski served in the Modlin Army. On 3 September 1939 he destroyed a German Observation balloon. The next day he escorted bombers PZL.23 Karaś, his plane was hit and damaged by flak, Brzeski was forced to land, but the same day he came back to his unit. On 9 September he damaged a plane near Lublin. On the night of 18/19 September he crossed the border with Romania, then on 19 November he came to France via Yugoslavia. He was assigned to a new unit only on 18 May 1940. Due to the difficult situation in France Brzeski was evacuated to the UK.

Initially he was assigned to No. 307 Polish Night Fighter Squadron, but on 14 October he was transferred to No. 303 Polish Fighter Squadron where he began training on Hurricane. On 10 February 1941 he downed a Messerschmitt Bf 109 over Dunkirk. On 25 February he was moved to No. 317 Polish Fighter Squadron. Since 23 April 1943 he served in No. 302 Polish Fighter Squadron and on 28 December he came back to No. 303 squadron.

On 21 May 1945 he was hit by flak over Abbeville, Brzeski slightly wounded, managed to land. After four hours he was captured by Germans and sent to Stalag Luft III. In January 1945 he was deported to the west. After the liberation he came back to England and served in RAF as instructor and flight controller.

Stanisław Brzeski died on 3 December 1972 in Norwich and was buried in the cemetery of Dereham.

Aerial victory credits
 He 111 - 9 September 1939 and one probably destroyed
 Bf 109E - 10 February 1941
 Bf 109 - 18 February 1941
 1/2 Bf 109 - 10 July 1941
 1/2 Ju 88 - 14 July 1941 
 Bf 109F - 8 November 1941 and one damaged
 Ju 88 - 6 December 1941
 Fw 190 - 25 April 1942
 Fw 190 - 26 July 1943 probably destroyed
 He 111 - 19 August 1942
 Fw 190 - 2 May 1943
 Fw 190 - 24 June 1943
 1/2 Fw 190 - 4 September 1943
 Fw- 190 - 23 September 1943 probably destroyed

Awards
 Virtuti Militari, Silver Cross 
 Cross of Valour (Poland), four times
 Distinguished Flying Cross (United Kingdom), with two bars,
 Distinguished Service Order (United Kingdom)

References

Further reading
 
 
 Tadeusz Jerzy Krzystek, Anna Krzystek: Polskie Siły Powietrzne w Wielkiej Brytanii w latach 1940-1947 łącznie z Pomocniczą Lotniczą Służbą Kobiet (PLSK-WAAF). Sandomierz: Stratus, 2012, s. 114. 
 Piotr Sikora: Asy polskiego lotnictwa. Warszawa: Oficyna Wydawnicza Alma-Press. 2014, s. 229–235. 
 Józef Zieliński: Asy polskiego lotnictwa. Warszawa: Agencja lotnicza ALTAIR, 1994, s. 34. 
 Józef Zieliński: 303 Dywizjon Myśliwski Warszawski im. Tadeusza Kościuszki. Warszawa: Bellona, 2003 

The Few
Recipients of the Distinguished Flying Cross (United Kingdom)
Polish World War II flying aces
Recipients of the Silver Cross of the Virtuti Militari
Recipients of the Cross of Valour (Poland)
1972 deaths
1918 births
Polish prisoners of war
World War II prisoners of war held by Germany
Polish emigrants to the United Kingdom